António Serôdio was a Portuguese equestrian. He competed in two events at the 1948 Summer Olympics.

References

Year of birth missing
Year of death missing
Portuguese male equestrians
Olympic equestrians of Portugal
Equestrians at the 1948 Summer Olympics
Place of birth missing